Cuckfield & Lucastes is an electoral division of West Sussex in England, and returns one member to sit on West Sussex County Council.

Extent
The division covers the town of Cuckfield and the western part of the town of Haywards Heath; and the villages of Ansty, Staplefield and Whitemans Green.

It comprises the Cuckfield and Haywards Heath Lucastes wards; the civil parishes of Ansty & Staplefield, Cuckfield; and the western part of Haywards Heath.

In March 2007, Anne Marie Morris resigned as councillor after she was selected as the Conservative candidate in the Devon seat of Newton Abbot for the 2010 United Kingdom general election.

Election results

2013 Election
Results of the election held on 2 May 2013:

2009 Election
Results of the election held on 4 June 2009:

2007 Bye-election
Results of the bye-election held on 3 May 2007:

2005 Election
Results of the election held on 5 May 2005:

References
Election Results - West Sussex County Council

External links
 West Sussex County Council
 Election Maps

Electoral Divisions of West Sussex